Till The Sunrise is the fourth studio album by Canadian Singer/Songwriter Matt Brouwer. The album was released on February 28, 2012. It was well received with many positive and glowing reviews. The album was nominated for 4 GMA Canada Covenant Awards including Pop/Contemporary Album of the Year in 2012 and song of the year nods (2012-2014). Till the Sunrise was also nominated in 2013 for Gospel Recording of the Year by the East Coast Music Awards, Contemporary Christian/Gospel Album of the Year by the Independent Music Awards and Inspirational Album of the year by Music Nova Scotia Awards. The song Ocean from the album won a GMA Canada Covenant Award for Inspirational Song of the Year.

Track listing

Awards

References

2012 albums
Matt Brouwer albums